Charles Allen (born March 3, 1977) is a Canadian track and field athlete, specializing in hurdling and sprinting.

Born in Georgetown, Guyana, Allen emigrated to Canada, first to Brampton where he attended Turner Fenton Secondary School, and then to Malton where he went to Ascension of Our Lord Secondary School.

Allen represented Canada at the 1996 World Junior Championships in Athletics in the 100 and 200 metres. He competed for Guyana in the 110 metres hurdles at the 2000 Summer Olympics, and still holds the Guyanese record in that event. By the time of the 2002 Commonwealth Games, Allen was again representing Canada.

At the 2004 Summer Olympics, Allen made the finals in the 110 m hurdles after setting a new personal best time in each of the qualifying rounds. He finished a respectable sixth, but in a slower time than he had hoped. He was also captain of Canada's 4 × 100 m relay team, but the team failed to pass the qualifying stages. At the 2006 Commonwealth Games in Melbourne, however, Allen won a bronze medal with the Canadian relay team.

References

External links
 
 
 
 
 

1977 births
Living people
Sportspeople from Georgetown, Guyana
Athletes (track and field) at the 2000 Summer Olympics
Athletes (track and field) at the 2004 Summer Olympics
Athletes (track and field) at the 2002 Commonwealth Games
Athletes (track and field) at the 2006 Commonwealth Games
Commonwealth Games bronze medallists for Canada
Commonwealth Games medallists in athletics
Athletes (track and field) at the 2003 Pan American Games
Pan American Games track and field athletes for Canada
World Athletics Championships athletes for Canada
Black Canadian track and field athletes
Canadian male hurdlers
Canadian male sprinters
Guyanese male hurdlers
Afro-Guyanese people
Guyanese emigrants to Canada
Olympic athletes of Guyana
Naturalized citizens of Canada
Olympic track and field athletes of Canada
Sportspeople from Brampton
Track and field athletes from Ontario
Clemson Tigers men's track and field athletes
Medallists at the 2006 Commonwealth Games